Admiral of the Realm was a military and political title given to nobles in Denmark-Norway, Sweden and Holy Roman Empire.

Denmark-Norway and Sweden
Almost at the same time in the 1570s, both Sweden and in Denmark-Norway created the Admiral of the Realm, and almost simultaneously it was abolished in both kingdoms in the 1670s again. In both kingdoms the Admiral of the Realm was Supreme Commander of all naval forces and chairman of the admiralty. Like the Marshal of the Realm, the Reichsadmiral was also one of the treasures of the country. As a member of the Privy Council, he was comparable to a senior government official, such as a minister of the navy.

Denmark-Norway
Commander-in-chiefs of the Danish-Norwegian fleets, appointed by the King, had existed since the beginning of the 16th century. In 1576, Peder Munk was appointed the first time Admiral of the Realm ( or ) for Denmark-Norway. The position was created to serve as Commander-in-chief of the navy.

List of Danish Admirals of the Realm

Sweden

The Swedish Admiral of the Realm was a prominent and influential office in Sweden, from c. 1571 until 1676, excluding periods when the office was out of use. The office holder was a member of the Swedish Privy Council and the head of the navy and Admiralty of Sweden. From 1634, the Lord High Admiral was one of five Great Officers of the Realm.

Holy Roman Empire

See also
Marshal of the Realm
Admiral of France
Lord High Admiral (disambiguation)

References
Citations

Bibliography
 
 

Political titles
Military ranks
Danish nobility